The desert short-horned lizard (Phrynosoma ornatissimum) is a horned lizard species native to Canada and the United States.

References

Phrynosoma
Reptiles of Mexico
Reptiles of the United States
Reptiles described in 1858
Taxa named by Charles Frédéric Girard